Nola Luxford  (born Adelaide Minola Pratt; 23 December 1895 – 10 October 1994) was a New Zealand-born American film actress, spanning from the silent film era to the 1930s. During the 1932 Summer Olympics in Los Angeles, she was also a writer and pioneer broadcaster, providing a daily radio programme for audiences in Australia and New Zealand.

Early life
Born Adelaide Minola Pratt in Hunterville, New Zealand, on 23 December 1895, and raised in Hastings, Luxford was the eldest of three children of Adelaide Agnes McGonagle, a schoolteacher, and Ernest Augustus Pratt, a draper.

Self-adjustments
She would later:
 Reverse her forename and middle name 
 Change her birthdate to coincide with that of her father (who was born 24 December)
 Shave six years off her age
 Change her birthplace to Auckland (on her U.S. citizenship petition)

Career
She left in 1919 for Hollywood to pursue a career in film acting. She was 23 years old and determined to distinguish herself after a family scandal in New Zealand. Her first film appearance was in the 1920 film The Tiger's Coat. From 1920 through 1927 she would appear in thirteen films, starring opposite and alongside such actors as Bill Cody, Jack Holt, and Carmel Myers. In 1932 she gave a daily one-hour radio report on the Olympics at Los Angeles for New Zealand and Australia, relayed "down under" by short-wave radio. She made six film appearances between 1932–1935, with the only credited ones of any notability being The Iron Master (starring Reginald Denny) and Lost in Limehouse (starring Laura La Plante), both in 1933. She retired after 1935, and settled in Pasadena, California.

Recording career
She founded the Anzac Club of New York, and through her wartime radio broadcasts she became known as the "Angel of the Anzacs". She was awarded the OBE for her services.

Personal life
Her first husband, Maurice George "Maurie" Luxford, whom she wed in 1919, died. She married, secondly, to William Bauernschmidt. She married her third husband, Glenn Russell Dolberg, in 1959; he died in 1977. She became a naturalized United States citizen on 12 November 1928. She continued to live in Pasadena, California, where she died on 10 October 1994, aged 98. She was survived by five nieces and one nephew.

Partial filmography

 The Tiger's Coat (1920) as Clare Bagsby
 The Mad Marriage (1921) as Bob
 Opened Shutters (1921) as Edna Derwent
 The Flying Dutchman (1923) as Melissa
 Rouged Lips (1923) as Mamie Dugan
 The House of Youth (1924) as Society Girl
 Girl Shy (1924) as Vamp girl (uncredited)
 The Prince of Pep (1925) as Marion Ward
 Border Justice (1925) as Mary Maitland
 That Devil Quemado (1925) as Conchita Rameriz
 Forlorn River (1926) as Magda Lee
 The Meddlin' Stranger (1927) as Mildred Crawford
 Ladies Beware (1927) as Jeannie
 King of the Herd (1927) as Nancy Dorance
 Lost in Limehouse (Short) (1933) as Diana
 The Ironmaster (1933) as Diana
 Kind Lady (1935) as Rose

References

Further reading
 Carole Van Grondelle, Angel of the Anzacs, Victoria University Press (1 June 2001); ISBN/SKU: 9780864733979

External links

1895 births
1994 deaths
20th-century New Zealand actresses
People from Hunterville
New Zealand silent film actresses
New Zealand film actresses
New Zealand emigrants to the United States
New Zealand expatriate actresses in the United States
New Zealand broadcasters
Honorary Officers of the Order of the British Empire
People with acquired American citizenship
People educated at Whanganui Girls' College